Corben Bone (born September 16, 1988 in Plano, Texas) is an American former professional soccer player.

Career

College and amateur
Bone played college soccer at Wake Forest University from 2007 to 2009 where he appeared in 68 games scoring 15 goals and adding 38 assists. He was a member of Wake Forest's 2007 NCAA College Cup Championship team. He was named ACC Offensive Player of the year in 2009.

During his college years Bone also played for both Cary RailHawks U23s and Carolina Dynamo in the USL Premier Development League.

Professional
Bone was drafted in the first round (13th overall) of the 2010 MLS SuperDraft by Chicago Fire. He made his professional debut on May 8, 2010 in a game against Toronto FC. In his four years at the club Bone only featured in 18 league matches. Bone moved to Philadelphia Union on December 12, 2013, when he was selected in stage one of the 2013 MLS Re-Entry Draft.

Bone was loaned to USL Pro club Wilmington Hammerheads on August 12, 2014. At the beginning of the following season, he made his move permanent.

After one year with Wilmington, Bone signed with FC Cincinnati ahead of their inaugural 2016 season. The club did not renew his contract in October 2019, and he was signed by Louisville City on November 26.

In November 2022, Louisville City FC announced that Bone had retired from his playing career to pursue other opportunities. As of December 2022, he was listed on the website of FC Cincinnati with the job title "Director of Soccer in the Community & Club Ambassador".

References

External links

 
 

1988 births
Living people
American soccer players
Soccer players from Texas
Cary Clarets players
North Carolina Fusion U23 players
Chicago Fire FC players
Philadelphia Union players
Wilmington Hammerheads FC players
Major League Soccer players
USL Championship players
USL League Two players
Wake Forest Demon Deacons men's soccer players
Wake Forest University alumni
Sportspeople from Plano, Texas
United States men's youth international soccer players
United States men's under-20 international soccer players
Chicago Fire FC draft picks
FC Cincinnati (2016–18) players
FC Cincinnati players
Louisville City FC players
All-American men's college soccer players
Association football midfielders